R.E.O./T.W.O. is the second studio album released by the Illinois-based rock band REO Speedwagon, released in 1972. Under the leadership of guitarist Gary Richrath, this album continued the musical direction set on 1971's REO Speedwagon with Richrath's own compositions carrying the record.

R.E.O./T.W.O. launched REO on its first national tour and presented a more polished production than the band‘s debut album; however, it still retained the progressive rock leanings that they were to ditch following the arrival of Mike Murphy and did not even have a slightly successful single to rival “Sophisticated Lady”. Despite this and R.E.O./T.W.O.’s failure to dent the Billboard Top 200, it has remained more readily available than the debut.  The album went gold on August 13, 1981.

The album introduced Kevin Cronin as vocalist and contributing songwriter to the band, replacing Terry Luttrell. Notable tracks on the album include Richrath’s political “Golden Country” as well as "Like You Do".  Both songs, as well as Cronin’s “Music Man”, are frequently part of the band's current setlist.

Track listing
All songs written by Gary Richrath, except where noted.

Side one
"Let Me Ride" (Kevin Cronin)  – 6:00
"How the Story Goes"  – 3:34
"Little Queenie" (Chuck Berry)  – 6:39
"Being Kind (Can Hurt Someone Sometimes)" (Cronin)  – 6:02

Side two
"Music Man" (Cronin)  – 4:38
"Like You Do"  – 5:57
"Flash Tan Queen"  – 4:23
"Golden Country"  – 6:33

Personnel
REO Speedwagon
Kevin Cronin – lead vocals, rhythm guitar
Gary Richrath – lead guitar
Neal Doughty – keyboards
Gregg Philbin – bass, backing vocals
Alan Gratzer – drums, backing vocals

Additional personnel
Boots Randolph – saxophone (track 3)
Kelly Bowen – backing vocals (track 1)
Tomi Lee Bradly – backing vocals (track 1)

Certifications

Release history

References

REO Speedwagon albums
1972 albums
Albums produced by Paul Leka
Epic Records albums